Sphaerodactylus kirbyi, commonly known as the Bequia dwarf gecko, the Bequia sphaero, or the Grenadines sphaero, is a species of gecko, a lizard in the family Sphaerodactylidae. The species is endemic to Bequia, an island in the Grenadines that is part of Saint Vincent and the Grenadines.

Etymology
The specific name, kirbyi, is in honor of Dr. Ian Earle Ayrton Kirby (1921-2006), who was a government veterinarian and naturalist on St. Vincent.

Description
It is gray-brown, occasionally with a yellowish tint on its chin, throat, and the sides of its neck. The underside of its tail is mottled with orange. It has irregular small blotches on its body, and faded stripes on its head. A gray inverse V-shape extends from its hind limbs to the base of its tail.

References

Further reading

Lazell J (1994). "A New Sphaerodactylus (Sauria: Gekkonidae) from Bequia, Grenada Bank, Lesser Antilles". Breviora (496): 1-20. (Sphaerodactylus kirbyi, new species).
.

External links
Sphaerodactylus kirbyi at the Encyclopedia of Life.
Sphaerodactylus kirbyi at the Reptile Database.

K
Lizards of the Caribbean
Endemic fauna of Saint Vincent and the Grenadines
Reptiles described in 1994